Winder-Barrow High School is a high school in Winder, Georgia, United States, serving grades 9–12. It has an enrollment of 1,911 students, and is the home of the Winder-Barrow "Bulldoggs."

Alumni
 Travis Demeritte, baseball player
  Brady House, baseball player
 Rico Mack, NFL football player
 Max Pentecost, baseball player
 Olivia Nelson-Ododa, basketball player
 Jena Sims, actress
 Chandon Sullivan, NFL football player

References

External links
 School website

Public high schools in Georgia (U.S. state)
Schools in Barrow County, Georgia